The Very Best of Randy Travis is a compilation album by American country music artist Randy Travis. It was released in 2004 via Warner Bros. Records. It includes nineteen of Travis' singles from his previous albums as well as one album track "I'm Gonna Have a Little Talk" from his 1991 album High Lonesome. The album peaked at number 10 on the Billboard Top Country Albums chart.

Track listing

Charts

Weekly charts

Year-end charts

References

2004 compilation albums
Randy Travis compilation albums
Warner Records compilation albums